HBF Dalgety Ltd v Morton [1987] 1 NZLR 411 is a leading case in New Zealand regarding accord and satisfaction; it reinforces the English case of Foakes v Beer in New Zealand.

Facts 
HBF Dalgety, a real estate agency, sold on behalf of Mr Morton his farm, for which he was later charged the standard fee of $9,768.98.
Two weeks after being invoiced this amount, Mr Morton sent back the invoice with the note attached of "my estimate of costs on a 'work done' basis, $2,450", and attached a cheque for $2,450, which was duly banked. HBF Dalgety then wrote a letter to Mr Morton saying they had not accepted his cheque as full settlement, and demanded he pay the balance of its fee of $7,318.98 ($13,645 in 2011 adjusted for inflation), which Mr Morton subsequently refused to pay, claiming accord and satisfaction.

Decision 
As the court ruled that there was no genuine dispute on this debt, there was neither any "accord" nor any "satisfaction" and so Mr Morton was ordered to pay the full amount claimed. Hillyer J said

References

External links
 Link to full text of case

High Court of New Zealand cases
New Zealand contract case law
1987 in case law
1987 in New Zealand law